A sacred garden is a religiously influenced garden, often found on temple grounds.

Overview
Religion has been an important influence on garden design. Temple gardens were made in Mesopotamia and ancient Egypt. Sacred groves were made in ancient India, Greece, Rome, China and Japan. Sacred trees were important in Celtic and Germanic Europe and still are important in India.

Many groves or forests were sacred in ancient India and continue to be so in modern Hindu worship. Buddhism had a significant influence on garden design, with the Zen gardens of China and Japan as famous examples. In Christianity, particularly Catholicism and Anglicanism, Mary gardens are common among churches and institutions.

The practise of creating sacred gardens is re-invigorated and adapted for modern times in the Ringing Cedars series of books by Russian author Vladimir Megre.

See also
List of plants for Biblical gardens
List of garden types

References

External links
 Sacred Space: Religion and Garden Design History
 Sacred Places: Introduction

 
Types of garden